Texas First Bank is a state-chartered bank located in six counties along the Texas Gulf Coast. Founded in 1973, the bank today has 22 locations throughout Galveston County, Chambers County, Texas, Brazoria County, Texas, Harris County, Texas, Jefferson County, Texas, and Liberty County, Texas. It is headquartered in Texas City, Texas and a wholly owned subsidiary of Texas Independent Bancshares, Inc.

History 
The bank was founded in 1973, when a group of investors organized by Charles T. "Chuck" Doyle, purchased First State Bank of Hitchcock. The group aimed to establish a network of community banks in all ten incorporated cities in Galveston County by the end of the Twentieth Century. After acquiring Bank of the West in Galveston, Texas in 1975, Bank of Santa Fe in 1977, Gulf National Bank in Texas City in 1982, and Gulf Shores Bank in 1985, the group changed the name of all banks in the network to Texas First Bank in on August 3, 1995..  The bank also opened branches in Kemah, Pirates Beach, Dickinson, League City, and Friendswood.

In 2000, Texas First Bank became affiliated with Rust, Ewing, Watt, & Haney Insurance Company. In 2004, the bank acquired Paramount Mortgage in League City and renamed it Texas First Mortgage.

In January 2005, Texas First Bank opened a Small Business Administration lending office in Pearland, Texas.

In 2006 Texas First Bank merged with Gulf Coast Bank. Sullivan Insurance Agency was purchased in 2008, and in 2012 they merged with the affiliated Houston Business Bank, which Texas First Bank owned a controlling interest in, as well as Texas Coastal Bank.

On January 1, 2014, Texas Independent Bancshares converted to a Subchapter S corporation, and in March 2017 the bank's assets reached $1 billion.

References

Sources
 FDIC Institution Directory
 Texas First Bank Website

External links
 Map of Texas First Bank Locations
 Texas First Bank

Companies based in Galveston, Texas
Texas City, Texas
Santa Fe, Texas
Banks based in Texas
Banks established in 1973